Ginny Ferson  (born 1963) is a British diplomat, who, since December 2013, has served as Deputy Governor of Bermuda. For several months during 2016 she served as Acting Governor of Bermuda. Ferson served as Deputy Governor of Pitcairn from 2007 until 2012.

Career
Ferson joined the Foreign and Commonwealth Office in 1987 having previously worked for Leicestershire County Council. She has worked in Mauritius, Luxembourg, South Korea and Pakistan.

In 2016 she was appointed to a role in St Helena overseeing the implementation of the recommendations of a review into child protection on the island.

She was appointed as an Officer of the Order of the British Empire in the Queen's Birthday Honours List in June 2017 in recognition of her work in "child safeguarding in the British Overseas Territories."

References

1963 births
Living people
British diplomats
Deputy Governors of Bermuda
Governors of Bermuda
Officers of the Order of the British Empire
People from Ashby-de-la-Zouch